Neri  is a common surname from Italy. It also can be found in Latin America and the U.S.A, particularly among those of Italian descent.

Etymology and history
Derived from the Italian word — nero (black), to describe a dark-complexioned or black-haired person, though many Neris have no connection to that, but were given the surname precisely because of its commonness. e.g.:
  Pet form of names, Raineri and Maineri;
  In honour to St. Philip Neri.

Variations
The spelling variations includes: Neretti, Neritti, Nerini, Neroni, Nerucci, Nieri and Nerozzi.

People
Adelaide Neri (1940–2018), Brazilian teacher and politician 
Alain Néri, French politician
Albert J. Neri (1952–2011), American political news correspondent, pundit, and political analyst
Alessandra Neri (born 1988), Italian racing driver
Ana Néri, Brazilian nurse and war heroine
Antonio Neri, Italian glass maker
Fernando Neri, Argentinian footballer
Francesca Neri (born 1954), Italian actress
Francisco Valmerino Neri (born 1976), known as "Neri", Brazilian footballer
Giacomo Neri (1916–2010), Italian professional football player and coach
Giancarlo Neri, Italian sculptor
Giulio Neri (1909-1958), Italian operatic bass
Greg Neri, pen name G. Neri, American author
Krizza Neri (born 1995), Filipina singer 
Laura Neri, Greek film director
Luigi Delneri, Italian football manager
Maino Neri (1924–1995), Italian footballer and manager 
Manuel Neri (born 1930), American artist
Massimiliano Neri,  Italian fashion model
Nick Neri (born 1995), American racing driver
Paul Néri (1917–1979), Italian racing cyclist
Philip Neri (1515–1595), Italian saint
Rodolfo Neri, Mexican astronaut
Romeo Neri, Italian gymnast
Romulo Neri (born 1950), Filipino educator and public servant
Rosalba Neri, Italian actress
Scott Neri, Mexican artist
Ernesto Neri, pen name E. Neri, United States Marine, financial advisor

References 

Italian noble families
French-language surnames
Italian-language surnames
Jewish surnames
Sephardic surnames

de:Gacus
pt:Neri